Samuel John Morgan (born 3 December 1946) is a Northern Irish former football player and coach.

Moving from non-League Gorleston to Port Vale in 1970, the young forward picked up the club's Player of the Year award 1972, before winning a move to Aston Villa the following year. Villa won promotion out of the Second Division in 1974–75, though he was never a first team regular and so was sold on to Brighton & Hove Albion later in 1975. Helping Brighton to promotion out of the Third Division in 1976–77, following this success he moved on to Cambridge United. With United he won promotion out of the third tier for a second successive season, before moving on to Sparta Rotterdam in the Netherlands. In 1979, he transferred to FC Groningen, helping them to the Eerste Divisie title in 1979–80. He then returned to his native Gorleston, who he later managed.

Between 1972 and 1978 he won eighteen caps for Northern Ireland, and scored three goals at international level. These goals came against Spain, Cyprus, and Norway. After his retirement he worked behind the scenes at various Football League clubs.

Early life
Morgan was born in East Belfast and attended Nettlefield Primary School alongside George Best. When he was 11 years old, his family settled in Gorleston-on-Sea, in England. He studied at the Nottingham Trent University to become a maths and physical education teacher.

Club career

Port Vale
Morgan entered the English Football League at the relatively older age of 23, having played for local club Gorleston in the Eastern Counties League before signing for Fourth Division club Port Vale in January 1970, after impressing on trial. The late bloomer made his professional debut as a substitute on 30 March 1970, scoring in a 1–1 draw at Newport County. After quitting teaching to take up professional football, he had to wait until the following season to make his full debut, appearing as the No. 10 on 15 August 1970, finding the net in a 2–0 win at Swansea City. The club won promotion to the Third Division at the end of the campaign, and he found himself to be a regular starter in the first team, and picked up six goals in forty games in the 1970–71 season.

He nearly left the club at the start of the 1971–72 campaign after falling out with manager Gordon Lee over his decision to remain resident in Great Yarmouth, rather than move closer to Vale Park. However the pair settled their dispute, and Morgan went on to score nine goals in 41 games, picking up the club's Player of the Year award. He went on to become the joint-top scorer in the 1972–73 season with eleven goals in 44 games (tied with strike partner Ray Williams). Aston Villa purchased Morgan for £22,222 in August 1973 (£5,400 also changed hands due to goalscoring bonuses).

Aston Villa
Aston Villa manager Vic Crowe had hoped that Morgan would prove an ideal replacement for ageing Scottish centre-forward Andy Lochhead. He scored four goals in twelve games during Villa's 1974–75 Second Division promotion campaign, though his season was hampered by a back injury which kept him out of the 1975 League Cup final. A groin injury and the form of new signing Andy Gray meant that Morgan played just the three games in the First Division before being sold to Brighton & Hove Albion for £30,000 in December 1975.

Brighton & Hove Albion
Morgan was signed to play as a strike partner for Fred Binney. It took him nine games to score his first goal for Albion, when he broke his duck with a brace against Crystal Palace on 24 February. He recorded a tally of seven goals in the 1975–76 season, including another brace at the Goldstone Ground against Swindon Town, though manager Peter Taylor quit the club in the summer. Morgan then broke his cheekbone during in a pre-season friendly against Luton Town. The 1976–77 season saw Brighton achieve promotion out of the Third Division as runners-up under new manager Alan Mullery, with Ian Mellor and Fred Binney proving a highly effective strike partnership and limiting Morgan to just two starts.

Cambridge United
In August 1977, Morgan dropped back into the Third Division, signing with Cambridge United for a fee of £15,000. He chose Cambridge over a return to Port Vale, then managed by Roy Sproson.Morgan left United in August 1978 after a dispute with the club.

Later career
Choosing to head to the Netherlands, rather than Norway, he signed with Sparta Rotterdam. He moved on to FC Groningen in 1979, where he achieved a fourth promotion as the club claimed the Eerste Divisie title. He returned to his old club Gorleston in 1980 and was appointed manager in 1982, staying in the post until 1985.

International career
Morgan won eighteen caps for his country between 1972 and 1978. He scored a goal on his debut in a 1–1 draw with Spain on 16 February 1972, after replacing Derek Dougan in the first eleven. He also scored against Cyprus on 8 May 1973 and Norway on 29 October 1975, both 3–0 home wins.

Style of play
Morgan was a brave and bustling forward.

Personal and later life
He married Alison and had a daughter, Hannah, and son, Ian. When his playing days were over he became a teacher in Gorleston. He also became team manager, secretary and later chairman of Great Yarmouth Schools F.A. He then became a schoolboy coach in the United States before returning to England to become a schoolboy coach at Norwich City youth team in 1990. In January 1998 he signed for Norwich full-time as the youth development officer and was able to become the club's first Director of their Football Academy, as he holds a UEFA Class A licence. He resigned his Norwich post in 2004 and moved to East Anglian neighbours Ipswich Town as education officer. In February 2009 he became Academy Manager. In February 2015, he was reported to have undergone stomach surgery in his battle against cancer.

Career statistics

Club statistics
Source:

International statistics

Honours
Individual
Port Vale F.C. Player of the Year: 1972

Port Vale
Football League Fourth Division promotion winner: 1969–70

Aston Villa
Football League Second Division promotion winner: 1974–75

Brighton & Hove Albion
Football League Third Division promotion winner: 1976–77

Cambridge United
Football League Third Division promotion winner: 1977–78

Groningen
Eerste Divisie: 1979–80

References

1946 births
Living people
Association footballers from Belfast
People from Gorleston-on-Sea
Schoolteachers from Northern Ireland
Alumni of the University of Nottingham
Association footballers from Northern Ireland
Northern Ireland international footballers
Association football forwards
Port Vale F.C. players
Aston Villa F.C. players
Brighton & Hove Albion F.C. players
Cambridge United F.C. players
Expatriate association footballers from Northern Ireland
Expatriate footballers in the Netherlands
Sparta Rotterdam players
FC Groningen players
Gorleston F.C. players
English Football League players
Eredivisie players
Eerste Divisie players
Football managers from Northern Ireland
Gorleston F.C. managers
Association football coaches
Norwich City F.C. non-playing staff
Ipswich Town F.C. non-playing staff
Mathematics educators